29th Army may refer to:

29th Army (Soviet Union)
Twenty-Ninth Army (Japan)

See also
 29th Army Corps (disambiguation)
 29th Battalion (disambiguation)
 29th Brigade (disambiguation)
 29th Division (disambiguation)
 29th Regiment (disambiguation)
 27 Squadron (disambiguation)